Ian Black (11 December 195425 October 2006) was a professional snooker player from Scotland.

Black had 11 seasons on the world snooker tour from 1981 to 1992, and achieved a best ranking of 47th.

He won the 1981 Scottish Professional Championship defeating Matt Gibson 11–7 in the final. In 1982 he reached the final again, losing 11–7 to Eddie Sinclair.

Death
Black died 25 October 2006 aged 51.

References

2006 deaths
Scottish snooker players
1954 births